Ricardo Manuel Andrade e Silva Sá Pinto (born 10 October 1972) is a Portuguese former footballer who played as a forward, currently manager of Persian Gulf Pro League club Esteghlal.

He was known for his fighting spirit, best displayed in his stints at Sporting CP, where he was dubbed "Ricardo Lion Heart" by the club's fans. In a career cut short by injury and suspension, he appeared in 230 Primeira Liga games (scoring 51 goals), also playing for Real Sociedad in Spain for two years.

Sá Pinto represented the Portugal national team in two European Championships, reaching the semi-finals at Euro 2000. He started working as a manager with Sporting in 2012, and also worked in eight foreign countries.

Club career
Born in Porto, Sá Pinto made his professional debut with local S.C. Salgueiros and soon represented the Portuguese under-21s, helping the side reach the 1994 UEFA European Championship final. He first appeared in the Primeira Liga with the former on 30 August 1992, coming on as a second-half substitute in a 2–0 away loss against S.C. Farense.

In the 1994–95 season, Sá Pinto joined Sporting CP. After some solid performances he attracted the attention of La Liga's Real Sociedad, signing a four-year contract in July 1997 for a fee of 400 million pesetas, but was issued with a year-long worldwide suspension before making his debut. He scored in his first official game for his new club, a 3–3 home draw with Real Oviedo on 30 August 1998.

After 70 matches and six goals in Spain, Sá Pinto returned to Sporting where he played six further years, troubled by many injuries, although he eventually gained team captaincy. In the 2006–07 campaign he joined fellow Portuguese international Sérgio Conceição at Standard Liège – with Jorge Costa having retired at the club in the summer – in the Belgian Pro League, and retired at almost 35.

International career
Sá Pinto received 45 caps for Portugal, 25 with Sporting and 20 for Real Sociedad, scoring nine times. His first game was on 7 September 1994 in a 2–1 win over Northern Ireland in Belfast, in which he netted the second goal. He played at UEFA Euro 1996, equalising against Denmark (1–1) in the group stage opener, and Euro 2000; he scored six times in qualification for the latter tournament, including a hat-trick in an 8–0 demolition of Liechtenstein in Coimbra on 9 June 1999.

On 26 March 1997, Sá Pinto assaulted national team coach Artur Jorge upon hearing the news of not having been picked up for a match. The player travelled to the Estádio Nacional in Lisbon where the team was practicing, and punched the manager in the face, being banned for one year from all national and international competitions.

Sá Pinto's last appearance was in the 6–0 victory over Cyprus for the 2002 FIFA World Cup qualifiers, on 6 June 2001. An injury prevented him from being present at the finals.

Coaching career

Early years (2009–2012)

In early November 2009, Sá Pinto returned to Sporting, replacing former teammate Pedro Barbosa as director of football as coach Paulo Bento was sacked following a string of poor performances/results. On 21 January 2010, following a physical confrontation with club player Liédson in the team's locker room after the 4–3 home win against C.D. Mafra for the Taça de Portugal, he immediately presented his resignation.

Sá Pinto had his first coaching experience in 2010, being named assistant at U.D. Leiria under Pedro Caixinha. On 13 February 2012, after a spell with Sporting under-19s, he was appointed first-team manager, replacing the fired Domingos Paciência.

On 25 May 2012, even though Sporting could only rank fourth in the league and lost the domestic cup final, Sá Pinto signed a new two-year contract with the Lions. On 4 October, however, following a 3–0 away loss to Videoton FC – led by former national teammate Paulo Sousa – in that season's UEFA Europa League, he was relieved of his duties.

Stints abroad (2013–2019)
Sá Pinto was appointed at Serbian giants Red Star Belgrade on 18 March 2013, winning the first eight SuperLiga matches in charge of the club but resigning his post on 19 June, in disagreement with its board of directors. From October 2013 to February 2015, he worked in the Super League Greece with OFI Crete F.C. and Atromitos FC.

Sá Pinto returned to Portugal and its capital in June 2015, after agreeing to become C.F. Os Belenenses manager in replacement of Lito Vidigal whilst signing a two-year contract. On 15 December, however, after a 4–3 away defeat against Académica de Coimbra and failure to qualify from the Europa League group stage, he resigned from his position.

On 29 May 2016, Sá Pinto was appointed manager of Al Fateh SC. On 11 June 2017, after a second spell with Atromitos and even though he had agreed to a new deal after an eighth-place finish, he left for Standard Liège; in spite of initially underperforming in the Belgian League, he led his team to the conquest of the domestic cup in his first year as well as a final runner-up league position, but left on 20 May 2018.

In August 2018, Sá Pinto was announced as the new manager of Legia Warsaw after signing a three-year contract with the Ekstraklasa club. He was sacked the following April with the team in second, five points off Lechia Gdańsk with three games remaining.

Return to Portugal (2019–2022)
On 3 July 2019, Sá Pinto returned to his country for the first time in four years, taking over S.C. Braga on a two-year deal. He was dismissed on 23 December with the team eighth in the league, despite winning their Europa League group.

Sá Pinto was appointed at Campeonato Brasileiro Série A side CR Vasco da Gama on 13 October 2020, signing a contract until the end of the season. He was relieved of his duties on 29 December, with the side in the relegation zone.

On 20 January 2021, Sá Pinto agreed to a two-and-a-half-year deal at Gaziantep F.K. of the Turkish Süper Lig. He left in May at the end of his first campaign, criticising his players, the club president and his predecessor Marius Șumudică.

Sá Pinto became Moreirense FC's third coach of the season on 7 January 2022, following the dismissals of João Henriques and Vidigal. He led the team to 16th place after a 4–1 win over F.C. Vizela on the final day sent C.D. Tondela down instead, but was relegated in the promotion/relegation play-offs after a 2–1 aggregate loss to G.D. Chaves. He missed the play-offs after being issued with a 15-day suspension and €2,805 fine for provoking opposing fans after the Vizela game, and then called for his club's supporters to revolt against the local National Republican Guard captain; the force initiated criminal proceedings against him for this declaration. Days later, his contract was allowed to expire.

Return to Asia (2022–)

On 21 June 2022, Sá Pinto was appointed coach of Iranian club Esteghlal FC, signing a two-year contract. He won the domestic Supercup on 2 November after beating F.C. Nassaji Mazandaran 1–0, and dedicated the conquest to the "country's women and men who are suffering".

Career statistics

|}

Managerial statistics

Honours

Player
Sporting CP
Primeira Liga: 2001–02
Taça de Portugal: 1994–95, 2001–02
Supertaça Cândido de Oliveira: 2000
UEFA Cup runner-up: 2004–05

Portugal U-21
UEFA European Under-21 Championship runner-up: 1994

Manager
Sporting CP
Taça de Portugal runner-up: 2011–12

Standard Liège
Belgian Cup: 2017–18

Esteghlal
Iranian Super Cup: 2022

References

External links

1972 births
Living people
Portuguese footballers
Footballers from Porto
Association football forwards
Primeira Liga players
S.C. Salgueiros players
Sporting CP footballers
La Liga players
Real Sociedad footballers
Belgian Pro League players
Standard Liège players
Portugal under-21 international footballers
Portugal international footballers
UEFA Euro 1996 players
UEFA Euro 2000 players
Portuguese expatriate footballers
Expatriate footballers in Spain
Expatriate footballers in Belgium
Portuguese expatriate sportspeople in Spain
Portuguese expatriate sportspeople in Belgium
Portuguese football managers
Primeira Liga managers
Sporting CP managers
C.F. Os Belenenses managers
S.C. Braga managers
Moreirense F.C. managers
Serbian SuperLiga managers
Red Star Belgrade managers
Super League Greece managers
Atromitos F.C. managers
Saudi Professional League managers
Al-Fateh SC managers
Belgian Pro League managers
Standard Liège managers
Legia Warsaw managers
Campeonato Brasileiro Série A managers
CR Vasco da Gama managers
Süper Lig managers
Gaziantep F.K. managers
Persian Gulf Pro League managers
Esteghlal F.C. managers
Portuguese expatriate football managers
Expatriate football managers in Serbia
Expatriate football managers in Greece
Expatriate football managers in Saudi Arabia
Expatriate football managers in Belgium
Expatriate football managers in Poland
Expatriate football managers in Brazil
Expatriate football managers in Turkey
Expatriate football managers in Iran
Portuguese expatriate sportspeople in Serbia
Portuguese expatriate sportspeople in Greece
Portuguese expatriate sportspeople in Saudi Arabia
Portuguese expatriate sportspeople in Poland
Portuguese expatriate sportspeople in Brazil
Portuguese expatriate sportspeople in Turkey
Portuguese expatriate sportspeople in Iran